Gregory Joseph Craven  (born 5 March 1958) is an Australian academic, who was the vice-chancellor and president of the Australian Catholic University from January 2008 to January 2021. On 8 April 2020, the ACU chancellor, John Fahey, announced Craven's planned retirement in an email to staff and students, which was to become effective in January 2021. His successor was named as Zlatko Skrbis, who took up his appointment as ACU's fourth Vice Chancellor on 11 January 2021.

Education
The literary critic Peter Craven is his older brother.

Career

Craven has researched and written on constitutional law, government, public policy, constitutional history and federalism. He was a leading advocate of republicanism in the leadup to the (eventually unsuccessful) 1999 referendum on the proposed change in Australia from being a constitutional monarchy to a republic. He is also noted as a key Australian Catholic layman for opinions on important issues.

Before joining ACU, he was foundation dean and Professor of Law at the University of Notre Dame Australia, and deputy vice-chancellor (strategy and planning) at Curtin University of Technology in Western Australia. He also served as executive director of the John Curtin Institute of Public Policy.

Craven has published numerous books and articles, mainly in the field of constitutional law and constitutional history. He is a regular columnist for The Australian newspaper.

Craven has served on a range of public bodies. He chaired the Teacher Education Ministerial Advisory Group and was deputy chair of the COAG Reform Council. He currently is a member of the Commonwealth Higher Education Standards Panel (HESP) and the lead vice-chancellor for Universities Australia on quality and regulation.

In February 2019, following the 2018 trial and conviction of Cardinal George Pell for child abuse, Craven provided one of 10 positive character references for the purposes of the sentencing hearing. Pell was eventually acquitted and all the convictions quashed by the High Court of Australia on 7 April 2020.

Within the Australian Catholic community, Craven is a member of the National Catholic Education Commission and the Truth, Justice and Healing Council.

Bibliography

Degrees and honours
Bachelor of Arts (BA), University of Melbourne (1980)
Bachelor of Laws (LLB), University of Melbourne (1981)
Master of Laws (LLM), University of Melbourne (1984),
Knight Grand Cross of the Order of St Gregory the Great (GCSG) (2015),
Officer of Order of Australia (AO) 2017

References

1958 births
Living people
20th-century Australian lawyers
Australian republicans
Officers of the Order of Australia
Recipients of the Centenary Medal
People educated at St Kevin's College, Melbourne
University of Melbourne alumni
Academic staff of the Australian Catholic University
Knights Grand Cross of the Order of St Gregory the Great